Reuben Osborne Moon (July 22, 1847 – October 26, 1919) was a Republican member of the U.S. House of Representatives for Pennsylvania.

Moon was born in Jobstown, New Jersey.  He graduated from the National School of Oratory, in Philadelphia, Pennsylvania, in 1874.  He became a professor in the National School of Oratory, and engaged in lecturing and studied law.  He was admitted to the bar in 1884 and commenced practice in Philadelphia.  He was one of the founders and president of the Columbia Club.

He was elected in 1903 as a Republican to the 58th Congress, by special election, to fill the vacancy caused by the death of United States Representative Robert H. Foerderer.  He served as Chairman, Committee on Revision of the Laws in the 59th through 61st Congresses. He was an unsuccessful candidate for renomination in 1912.

He died in Philadelphia on October 26, 1919.  He is interred at West Laurel Hill Cemetery in Bala Cynwyd, PA.

References

1847 births
1919 deaths
People from Springfield Township, Burlington County, New Jersey
Republican Party members of the United States House of Representatives from Pennsylvania
19th-century American politicians